Caleb Barnes Harman (1772 – 3 January 1796) was an Anglo-Irish politician. 

Harman was the Member of Parliament for Longford County in the Irish House of Commons between 1793 and his death in 1796. He was a land agent on the estate of the Harman family and lived at Bawn House, near Moydow. He was fatally shot during a robbery at the house in January 1796.

References

1772 births
1796 deaths
18th-century Anglo-Irish people
Irish MPs 1790–1797
Members of the Parliament of Ireland (pre-1801) for County Longford constituencies